Passer l'hiver is a 2013 French drama film directed by Aurélia Barbet and starring Gabrielle Lazure and Lolita Chammah. The film is loosely based on a short story by Olivier Adam.

Cast 
 Gabrielle Lazure as Claire 
 Lolita Chammah as Martine
 Sophie Cattani as The hotel manager
 Cyril Descours as Michel
 Thierry Levaret as Alain 
 Joana Preiss as Anita
 Yoan Charles as Luc
 Sabine Londault as Claire's mother

References

External links 
 

2013 films
2010s drama road movies
2010s French-language films
French drama road movies
Films based on short fiction
2013 directorial debut films
2013 drama films
2010s French films